Goulburn is a regional city in the Southern Tablelands of the Australian state of New South Wales, approximately  south-west of Sydney, and  north-east of Canberra. It was proclaimed as Australia's first inland city through letters patent by Queen Victoria in 1863. Goulburn had a population of 23,835 at June 2018. Goulburn is the seat of Goulburn Mulwaree Council.

Goulburn is a railhead on the Main Southern line, a service centre for the surrounding pastoral industry, and also stopover for those traveling on the Hume Highway. It has a central park and many historic buildings. It is also home to the monument the Big Merino, a sculpture that is the world's largest concrete-constructed sheep.

History
Goulburn was named by surveyor James Meehan after Henry Goulburn, Under-Secretary for War and the Colonies, and the name was ratified by Governor Lachlan Macquarie.

The colonial government made land grants to free settlers such as Hamilton Hume in the Goulburn area from the opening of the area to settlement in about 1820. Land was later sold to settlers within the Nineteen Counties, including Argyle County (the Goulburn area). The process displaced the local indigenous Mulwaree population and the introduction of exotic livestock drove out a large part of the Aboriginal peoples' food supply.

Indigenous history
The Mulwaree People lived throughout the area covering Goulburn, Crookwell and Yass and belong to the Ngunawal language group. To the north of Goulburn Gundungurra was spoken within the lands of the Dharawal People. This was due to Gundungurra people of the Blue Mountains being driven south from their traditional land due to Governor Macquarie's parties sent to massacre the Dharawal and Gundungurra People.

Their neighbours were the Dharawal to their north and Dharug surrounding Sydney, Darkinung, Wiradjuri Ngunawal and Thurrawal, (eastwards) peoples. The reduction of the food supply and the introduction of exotic diseases, substantially reduced the local indigenous population.

European settlement 
The first recorded settler in Goulburn established 'Strathallan' in 1825 (on the site of the present Police Academy) and a town was originally surveyed in 1828, although moved to the present site of the city in 1833 when the surveyor Robert Hoddle laid it out.

George Johnson purchased the first land in the area between 1839 and 1842 and became a central figure in the town's development. He established a branch store with a liquor licence in 1848. The 1841 census records Goulburn had a population of 665 people, 444 males and 211 females. This number had jumped to 1,171 inhabitants by 1847, 686 males and 485 females. It had a courthouse, police barracks, churches, hospital and post office and was the centre of a great sheep and farming area.

A telegraph station opened in 1862, by which time there were about 1,500 residents, a blacksmith's shop, two hotels, two stores, the telegraph office and a few cottages. The town was a change station (where coach horses were changed) for Cobb & Co by 1855. A police station opened the following year and a school in 1858. Goulburn was proclaimed a municipal government in 1859 and was made a city in 1863.

The arrival of the railway in 1869, which was opened on 27 May by the Governor Lord Belmore (an event commemorated by Belmore Park in the centre of the city), along with the completion of the line from Sydney to Albury in 1883, was a boon to the city. Later branchlines were constructed to Cooma (opened in 1889) and later extended further to Nimmitabel and then to Bombala, and to Crookwell and Taralga. Goulburn became a major railway centre with a roundhouse and engine servicing facilities and a factory which made pre-fabricated concrete components for signal boxes and station buildings. The roundhouse is now the Goulburn Rail Heritage Centre with steam, diesel and rolling stock exhibits. CFCL Australia operate the Goulburn Railway Workshops.

St Saviour's Cathedral, designed by Edmund Thomas Blacket, was completed in 1884 with the tower being added in 1988 to commemorate the Bicentenary of Australia. Though completed in 1884, some earlier burials are in the graveyard adjacent to the cathedral. St Saviour's is the seat of the Bishop of Canberra and Goulburn. The Church of SS Peter and Paul is the former cathedral for the Roman Catholic Archdiocese of Canberra and Goulburn.

The Goulburn Viaduct was built in 1915 replacing an earlier structure. This brick arch railway viaduct spanning the Mulwaree Ponds is the longest on the Main Southern railway line and consists of 13 arches each spanning .

Proclaimed a city

Goulburn holds the unique distinction of being proclaimed a City on two occasions. The first, unofficial, proclamation was claimed by virtue of Royal Letters Patent issued by Queen Victoria on 14 March 1863 to establish the Diocese of Goulburn. It was a claim made for ecclesiastical purposes, as it was required by the traditions of the Church of England. The Letters Patent also established St Saviour's Church as the Cathedral Church of the diocese. This was the last instance in which Letters Patent were used in this manner in the British Empire, as they had been significantly discredited for use in the colonies, and were soon to be declared formally invalid and unenforceable in this context. Several legal cases over the preceding decade in particular had already established that the monarch had no ecclesiastical jurisdiction in colonies possessing responsible government. This had been granted to NSW in 1856, seven years earlier. The Letters Patent held authority only over those who submitted to it voluntarily, and then only within the context of the Church—it had no legal civil authority or implications. An absolute and retrospective declaration to this effect was made in 1865 in the Colenso Case, by the Judiciary Committee of the Privy Council.

However, under the authority of the Crown Lands Act 1884 (48. Vict. No. 18), Goulburn was officially proclaimed a City on 20 March 1885 removing any lingering doubts as to its status. This often unrecognised controversy has in no way hindered the development of Goulburn as a regional centre, with an impressive court house (completed in 1887) and other public buildings, as a centre for wool selling, and as an industrial town.

Goulburn School Strike 

In 1962, Goulburn was the focus of the fight for state aid to non-government schools. An education strike was called in response to a demand for installation of three extra toilets at a local Catholic primary school, St Brigid's. The local Catholic archdiocese closed down all local Catholic primary schools and sent the children to the government schools. The Catholic authorities declared that they had no money to install the extra toilets. Nearly 1,000 children turned up to be enrolled locally and the state schools were unable to accommodate them. The strike lasted only a week but generated national debate. In 1963 the prime minister, Robert Menzies, made state aid for science blocks part of his party's platform.

Heritage listings 

Goulburn has a number of heritage-listed sites, including:

 165 Auburn Street: Goulburn Post Office
 170 Bourke Street: St Saviour's Cathedral, Goulburn
 Bungonia Road: Old Goulburn Brewery
 Bungonia Road: Lansdowne Park
 Clifford Street: Colonial Mutual Life Building
 248 Main Road: Rossi Bridge over Wollondilly River
 Main Southern railway: Goulburn Viaduct
 Main Southern railway: Goulburn railway station
 off Maud Street: Goulburn Correctional Centre
 Maud Street: Riversdale
 4 Montague Street: Goulburn Court House
 Sloane Street: Connollys Mill
 Sloane Street: Old Police Barracks, Goulburn
 Sloane Street: Goulburn Railway Workshops
 244-248 Sloane Street: Alpine Lodge Motel
 318 Sloane Street: St Clair
 Taralga Road: Kenmore Asylum
 42 Verner Street: St Peter and Paul's Old Cathedral
 Wollondilly River: Goulburn Pumping Station

Population

According to the 2016 census of population, there were 22,890 people in Goulburn.
 Aboriginal and Torres Strait Islander people made up 4.3% of the population. 
 83.7% of people were born in Australia. The next most common countries of birth were England 1.9%, New Zealand 1.0%, India 0.6% and Philippines 0.6%.   
 86.7% of people spoke only English at home. 
 The most common responses for religion were Catholic 28.7%, Anglican 25.3% and No Religion 20.7%.

Geography
It is intersected by the Wollondilly River and the Mulwaree River, and the confluence of these two rivers is also located here. The Wollondilly then flows north-east, into Lake Burragorang (Warragamba Dam) and eventually into the Tasman Sea via the Hawkesbury River. The city is located within the Southern Tablelands Temperate Grassland.

Climate
Owing to its elevation, Goulburn has an oceanic climate (Cfb) with warm summers and cool winters; with a high diurnal range. Snow occasionally falls, although rarely in significant quantities due to the foehn effect brought about by the ranges to the west of Goulburn—namely, those straddling Crookwell.

Governance

As a major settlement of southern New South Wales, Goulburn was the administrative centre for the region and was the location for important buildings of the district.
The first lock-up in the town was built in 1830.
In 1832 a postal service commenced in Goulburn, four years after the service was adopted in New South Wales.
The first town plan had been drawn up by Assistant Surveyor Dixon in 1828, but the site was moved, as it was subject to flooding. The new town plan was drawn up by Surveyor Hoddle and was gazetted in 1833.Goulburn is the seat of the Goulburn Mulwaree Shire local government area (LGA) of New South Wales, Australia, formed in 2004. The most recent elections for Council were held on 13 September 2008. Two of the elected Councillors, Max Hadlow and Keith Woodman resigned due to ill health in 2009. A by-election to fill the vacancies was held in June 2009 and resulted in the election of Councillors Geoffrey Kettle and Geoffrey Peterson. Councillor Geoffrey Kettle was elected Mayor, replacing Councillor Carol James, in September 2010.

New South Wales Police Academy

The Police Academy relocated to Goulburn from Sydney in 1984. At this time it was known as the New South Wales Police Academy; however, the name has subsequently changed.

The Academy has relocated to the former campus of the Goulburn College of Advanced Education located on the banks of the Wollondilly River. The New South Wales Police Academy is now the largest education institution for law enforcement officers in the southern hemisphere.

Since its relocation there has been significant expansion of the facilities including a new site on the Taralga Road which houses the New South Wales Police School of Traffic and Mobile Policing.

Goulburn Gaol 
Goulburn is home to Goulburn Correctional Centre, more generically known as Goulburn Gaol. It is a maximum-security male prison, the highest-security prison in Australia and is home to some of the most dangerous, and infamous, prisoners. One of these prisoners was Ivan Robert Marko Milat (27 December 1944 – 27 October 2019) an Australian serial killer who was convicted of the backpacker murders in 1996.

Culture

Theatre 
Goulburn is home to Australia's oldest existing theatre company Lieder Theatre Company, established in 1891. The Lieder Theatre Company presents up to five major performance projects each year, along with numerous community events, readings, workshops, and short seasons of experimental and new work. The company, along with the Lieder Youth Theatre Company, is based in the historic Lieder Theatre, built by the company in 1929.

A former quarry adjacent to the Main Southern railway line in North Goulburn was used to film cliff top scenes in the 2016 film Hacksaw Ridge.

Sport
The most popular sport in Goulburn is rugby league. The town has a team, the Goulburn City Bulldogs, who play in the Canberra Rugby League. The club was founded in 2020, superseding the Goulburn Workers Bulldogs. Historically, there have been many clubs in Goulburn, including:
  Goulburn United Roosters (1932-86)
  Goulburn Workers Bulldogs (1958-84, 2008-19)
  Goulburn City (1987)
  Goulburn Gladiators (1991-95)
  Goulburn Stockmen (1996-07)

The Goulburn Stockmen played in bith the Canberra Rugby League and also the Group 6 Rugby League before folding. The town's junior rugby league team is still called the Goulburn Junior Stockmen. 

The Goulburn Dirty Reds rugby union team play in the John I Dent Cup third grade and Goulburn City Swans Australian rules club play in a lower grade Canberra competition. Other sports played in the town include soccer, cricket and tennis among others.

Health

Goulburn Medical Clinic
The Goulburn Medical Clinic was established in 1946 making it the most longstanding medical practice in the city. Historically, it was the first group practice of any size established in New South Wales and probably only the third in Australia. The clinic has a mixture of general practitioners and specialists that provide comprehensive healthcare.

Water supply

With a history of water shortages, an  underground water supply pipeline was constructed to pump water from the Wingecarribee Reservoir in the Southern Highlands to Goulburn, opening in 2011. This pipeline has a capacity of 7.5 ML per day.

The $54 million water supply pipeline was at the time the largest construction project in the history of Goulburn.

Transport

Goulburn is approximately two hours' drive from Sydney via the Hume Highway, or a one-hour drive from Canberra via the Federal and Hume Highways. Goulburn was bypassed in 1992 due to increasing traffic on the Hume Highway.

Prior to the city being bypassed in 1992, the Hume Highway brought 23,000 cars through the city each day. Goulburn's city centre was populated by a notable number of eateries owned and operated by Greek migrants, as part of a broader trend of Greek cafes and milk bars in regional Australia. Years after the bypass, the main street of town featured numerous neon signs advertising businesses that had since gone out of business. These signs were largely removed in the late 1990s.

Goulburn railway station is the southern terminus of the Southern Highlands Line which reaches from Campbelltown and is part of the NSW TrainLink intercity passenger train system. The station is also served by the long distance Southern XPT and Xplorer trains between Sydey and Griffith, Canberra and Southern Cross railway station in Melbourne. All services are operated by NSW TrainLink.

Public transport within Goulburn consists of the local taxi service that operates twenty-seven taxis, Goulburn Radio Cabs. A bus service is operated by PBC Goulburn.

Goulburn Tourist Information Centre has a Tesla Motors Supercharger station.

Media

Newspapers

The Goulburn Post, established as the Goulburn Evening Post in 1870 is Goulburn’s local newspaper. It runs three times per week and is owned by Australian Community Media.

Radio stations 
Radio stations with transmitters located in or nearby to Goulburn include:

AM:
 Radio National (2RN) 1098 AM

FM:
 Raw FM 87.6 (narrowcast)
 Triple J (2JJJ) 88.7 FM
 ABC Classic FM (2ABCFM) 89.5 FM
 ABC Local Radio (2ABCRR) 90.3 FM
 Eagle FM 93.5 (2SNO) (commercial)
 Sky Sports Radio 94.3 FM (narrowcast)
 ABC NewsRadio (2PNN) 99.9 FM
 Kix Country Radio 100.7 FM (narrowcast)
 2GCR 103.3 FM (community)
 GNFM 107.7 FM (2GBN) (commercial)

Depending on location some Illawarra- and/or Canberra-based radio stations can also heard.

Television
Goulburn receives five free-to-air television networks relayed from Canberra, and broadcast from nearby Mt Gray:

 ABC
 SBS
 Prime7
WIN Television
Southern Cross 10

A much smaller retransmission site also exists to cover residences in the suburb of Eastgrove.

Landmarks

Goulburn's second court house was built in 1847; designed by Mortimer Lewis, the colonial architect. James Barnet, the colonial architect from 1862 to 1890, built a number of buildings in Goulburn. These included the Goulburn Gaol that opened 1884; the current court house that opened in 1887; and a post office in 1881. Barnet's successor, Walter Liberty Vernon, was responsible for the first buildings of Kenmore Hospital, completed in 1894. St Saviour's Anglican Cathedral and Hall were designed by Edmund Blacket. Building started in 1874 and it was dedicated in 1884. It was finally consecrated in 1916. A tower was added in 1988 as part of a Bicentennial project but Blacket's plans included a spire which is yet to be added. E.C. Manfred was a prominent local architect responsible for many of the buildings in the city, including the first public swimming baths opened in 1892; the old Town Hall constructed in 1888; the Goulburn Base Hospital designed in 1886; the old Fire Station built in 1890; the Masonic Temple built in 1928; he also designed the earlier building of 1890 it replaced. Goulburn's first permanent fire station built 1890 and designed by local architect E.C. Manfred. The city was home to Kenmore Hospital, a psychiatric hospital which was finally closed in 2003. Goulburn remains a hub for mental health with facilities now located at the Goulburn Base Hospital.

Goulburn Rail Heritage Centre
The roundhouse at Goulburn was a significant locomotive depot both in the steam and early diesel eras. After closure it became the Goulburn Rail Heritage Centre, a railway museum with preserved steam and diesel locomotives as well as many interesting examples of rolling stock. Some minor rail operators such as RailPower have used the site to restore diesel locomotives to working order for main line use.

Notable people
 Andrew Blackshaw, international softball player
 Todd Carney, (born 1986) Australian rugby league player
 Jarrod Croker, (born 1990) Australian rugby league player, captain Canberra Raiders (2015–)
 Bruce Devlin, former professional golfer who won 8 tournaments on the US PGA Tour
 Michael Diamond, Target Shooter and Olympic gold medalist
 Miles Franklin, (1879–1954) writer and feminist
 Thomas Hazelton, (born 1999) Australian rugby league footballer
 William Hovell, (1786–1875) a famous English-born Australian explorer is buried in one of the many cemeteries
 Rod Jackson, (born 1951) Australian rugby league player
 George Lazenby, (born 1939) the only Australian actor to play James Bond, in On Her Majesty's Secret Service
 Donald MacDonald, (1857–1937) Australian pastoralist
 Marc McDermott, (1871–1929) American silent film star
 George Ogilvie, theatre director, born in Goulburn in 1931
 Simon Poidevin, Australian Rugby Union Player and World Cup Winner in 1991
 Kate Ritchie, (born 1978) actress and radio host
 Sally Shaw, (born 1978) Australian cricketer
 Ursula Stephens, Australian ALP Senator (2002–2014)
 Glen Turner, Australian Kookaburras hockey player

See also

 Goulburn Rugby Union
 Pejar Dam
 Wakefield Park
 High School, Goulburn

References

External links

Goulburn Mulwaree Council
Goulburn Visitor Information Centre

 
VisitNSW.com – Goulburn Area

 
Southern Tablelands
Hume Highway